Elaphidion bahamicae is a species of beetle in the family Cerambycidae. It was described by Cazier and Lacey in 1952.

References

B
Beetles of North America
Fauna of the Bahamas
Insects of the Caribbean
Beetles described in 1952